As Plantas Que Curam is the debut album by Brazilian psychedelic rock band Boogarins released in 2013.

Track listing

Personnel
Boogarins
 Hans Castro - drums
 Dinho Almeida - vocals and rhythm guitar
 Benke Ferraz - solo guitar
 Raphael Vaz - bass guitar

Additional personnel
 Boogarins - Producer

References

Boogarins albums
2013 debut albums